Montauroux is a commune in the Var department in the Provence-Alpes-Côte d'Azur region in southeastern France.

Its neighbor town is the picturesque Callian which can be seen across a small valley.

Geography

Montauroux is situated in the east of the Var and at the border of the Alpes-Maritimes. Montauroux rises in tiers of altitudes from 150 m to 400 m. The village has a southern exposure, facing the Esterel massif and the St Cassien Lake. Montauroux benefits from an exceptional amount of sunny days and is visited by tourists in the summer months, many hotels are often fully booked for the summer by mid-April or earlier.

It is also part of the Pays de Fayence, a communauté de communes.

Population

See also
Communes of the Var department

References

Communes of Var (department)